Philip Morgan Woodward (2 February 1912 – 10 November 1997) was an Australian judge. He chaired the Royal Commission into Drug Trafficking.

Woodward was President of the New South Wales Bar Association from 1969 to 1971,  and President of the Australian Bar Association from 1970 to 1971. He was awarded the National Medal in 1992.

On 10 November 1997 Woodward died in a head-on car crash after suffering a heart attack.

References

1912 births
1997 deaths
Australian royal commissioners
Australian King's Counsel
Judges of the Supreme Court of New South Wales
Road incident deaths in New South Wales